Frank Fultz (born November 19, 1951 in Chicago) was the manager of the Rookie-class Kingsport Mets in 2011 and was the strength and conditioning coach for the U.S.-based Atlanta Braves baseball team. He held the position since 1992, and resigned in June 2008. He was replaced by Phil Falco.

External links
Baseball Reference - minors

References

1951 births
American strength and conditioning coaches
Living people
Atlanta Braves coaches
Minor league baseball managers
Baseball coaches from Illinois
Sportspeople from Chicago